Lovilo N. Holmes (October 10, 1830 - May 7, 1914) was a soldier in the Union Army and recipient of the Medal of Honor during the American Civil War.

Biography 
Holmes was born in Farmersville, New York in 1830. During the Civil War he served as a First Sergeant in Company H of the 2nd Minnesota Volunteer Infantry Regiment. His medal was for actions at Nolensville, Tennessee on February 15, 1863. His citation reads "Was one of a detachment of 16 men who heroically defended a wagon train against the attack of 125 cavalry, repulsed the attack and saved the train." The medal was presented on September 11, 1897. He died in 1914 and is now buried in Glenwood Cemetery, Mankato, Minnesota.

External links 
 Extra Information on Holmes

References 

1830 births
1914 deaths
Union Army officers
United States Army Medal of Honor recipients
People from Cattaraugus County, New York